Belomitra climacella is a species of sea snail, a marine gastropod mollusc in the family Belomitridae.

Description

Distribution
This marine species occurs off New Zealand and off Oahu Island, Hawaii at a depth of 642 m.

References

 Dall (1895), Proc. U.S. Natl. Mus. 17(1032): 679, pl. 31, fig. 14
 Bouchet, P. & Warén, A. (1985a) Mollusca Gastropoda: taxonomical notes on tropical deep water Buccinidae with descriptions of new taxa. Mémoires du Muséum National d’Histoire Naturelle, Paris, série A, Zoologie, 133, 457–499, 18 pls.

Belomitridae